Jacob Bowman "Rube" Geyer (March 26, 1884 – October 12, 1962) was a Major League Baseball pitcher who played for the St. Louis Cardinals from 1910 to 1913. His key pitch was the drop ball.

References

External links

1884 births
1962 deaths
Major League Baseball pitchers
St. Louis Cardinals players
Baseball players from Pennsylvania
Nashville Vols players
Lancaster Lanks players
Columbus Senators players
Oakland Oaks (baseball) players
Minor league baseball managers
Boone Greyhounds players